Grzegorz Szerszenowicz (15 January 1945 – 3 November 2020) was a Polish football player who played as a goalkeeper, player and coach.

Playing career
He played in several clubs at home and abroad, including Cresovia Gołdap, AZS-AWF Warszawa, Broń Radom, Jagiellonia Białystok and the Mazur Ełk.

Coaching career
Szerszenowicz also trained several Polish clubs like Mazur Ełk, Wigry Suwałki, Sokół Sokółka, Warmia Grajewo and  Zagłębie Lubin, Lech Poznań, Jagiellonia Białystok.

Lech Poznań
Polish Cup: 1987–88

Best coach in the 90th Anniversary of Lech Poznań: 2012

Personal life
He graduated from the Józef Piłsudski University of Physical Education and Warsaw School of Economics.

References

External links
 Grzegorz Szerszenowicz – Jagiellonia Białystok page .

1945 births
2020 deaths
SGH Warsaw School of Economics alumni
Polish footballers
Association football goalkeepers
Jagiellonia Białystok players
Mazur Ełk players
Polish football managers
Jagiellonia Białystok managers
Lech Poznań managers
Zagłębie Lubin managers
Wigry Suwałki managers
Olimpia Zambrów managers
People from Hajnówka County